Gideon Ellis Newman was a member of the Wisconsin State Assembly.

Biography
Newman was born on October 26, 1823, in Dixfield, Maine. On November 19, 1848, he married Elizabeth Wardall. They would have six children.

In 1854, Newman settled in Cooksville, Wisconsin. During the American Civil War, he enlisted with the 35th Wisconsin Volunteer Infantry Regiment of the Union Army. He took part in the Battle of Spanish Fort and achieved the rank of first lieutenant. Newman died on February 7, 1911, and was buried in Cooksville.

Assembly career
Newman was a member of the Assembly during the 1877 session. He was a Republican.

References

External links

Wisconsin Historical Society

People from Dixfield, Maine
People from Porter, Wisconsin
Republican Party members of the Wisconsin State Assembly
People of Wisconsin in the American Civil War
Union Army officers
Union Army soldiers
1823 births
1911 deaths
Burials in Wisconsin
19th-century American politicians